San Julián is a town and municipality of about 30,000 people in the Los Altos region of the Mexican state of Jalisco.

San Julian is a town and municipality of the state of Jalisco, Mexico. Located northeast of Jalisco, in the Southern Highlands Region. Its land area is 268.44 km 2 and is located within the coordinates. According to Count II of Population and Housing, is mainly engaged in the tertiary and secondary. Nearly the whole population is of the Roman Catholic Religion. This devoutness of the religion led to the first armed uprising against the government, commanded by General Miguel Hernández. This uprising was the  beginning of the Cristero War A consequence of this was martyred saint Julio Alvarez Mendoza who was tortured to death. The torture included acts such as walking on hot rocks after have the skin from the bottom of his foot cut off.

The main festivity is La Candelaria, celebrated each year on February 2, where revelers can attend carnivals, a certamen, dances, rodeos, theater, and some years, the circus. The carnivals last approximately two weeks. This includes multiple food stands, games with prizes, and a variety of entertaining rides.

References

Municipalities of Jalisco